The Combat Capabilities Development Command, (DEVCOM, aka CCDC) (formerly the United States Army Research, Development, and Engineering Command (RDECOM)) is a subordinate command of the U.S. Army Futures Command. RDECOM was tasked with "creating, integrating, and delivering technology-enabled solutions" to the U.S. Army. Headquartered at Aberdeen Proving Ground in Maryland, RDECOM employed more than 13,000 scientists, engineers, researchers, and support personnel working at six major RDE centers and at the U.S. Army Research Laboratory (ARL), providing nearly all of the Army's basic and applied research and development services, including in collaboration with other branches of the armed forces and through a network of more than a thousand academic, industrial, and international partners.

 CCDC now includes the DEVCOM Analysis Center (formerly ARL/SLAD and AMSAA), and aligns with the top six priorities of AFC:
Long Range Precision Fires (LRPF)
Next Generation Combat Vehicles (NGCV)
Future Vertical Lift (FVL)
Army Network
Air & Missile Defense
Soldier Lethality
as well as Multi-Domain Operations (MDO).

Role and organization
CCDC formerly described its role as "the Army's enabling command in the development and delivery of capabilities that empower, unburden and protect the Warfighter." It conducts and sponsors scientific research in areas important to the Army, develops scientific discoveries into new technologies, engineers technologies into new equipment and capabilities, and works with the U.S. Army Training and Doctrine Command to help requirements writers define the future needs of the Army.

CCDC is headquartered at Aberdeen Proving Ground. Before 1 November 2019, Major-General Cedric T. Wins was the commanding general, assisted by Brigadier-General Vincent F. Malone as deputy commanding general and Command Sergeant-Major Jon R. Stanley as command sergeant major. They oversee one laboratory and six major centers:

 US Army CCDC Army Research Laboratory (CCDC ARL) – formerly Army Research Laboratory
 US Army CCDC Chemical Biological Center (CCDC CBC) – formerly Edgewood Chemical Biological Center
 US Army CCDC Soldier Center (CCDC SC) – formerly Natick Soldier Research, Development and Engineering Center
 US Army CCDC Ground Vehicle System Center (CCDC GVSC) – formerly Tank Automotive Research, Development and Engineering Center
 US Army CCDC Aviation & Missile Center (CCDC AvMC) – formerly Aviation and Missile Research, Development and Engineering Center
 US Army CCDC Armaments Center (CCDC AC) – formerly Army Armaments Research, Development and Engineering Center
 US Army CCDC C5ISR Center (CCDC C5ISRC) – formerly Communications-Electronics Research, Development and Engineering Center

History
After assuming command of the Army Materiel Command in October 2001, General Paul J. Kern saw the need to streamline how the Army developed technology. At the time, the Army's laboratories and research centers reported through multiple channels, among other problems. Kern argued that the Army had to "figure out how to get technology in the hands of the Warfighters quicker" and that it was "the impression of everyone out there that the laboratories take too long, they do science for science's sake, engineering for engineering's sake". Kern proposed to unite the laboratories and research centers under a single command, and the idea was initiated to senior commanders and civilians. The new command was approved, and was provisionally stood up in October 2002, based at Aberdeen Proving Ground where it replaced and integrated the headquarters element of the Soldier and Biological Chemical Command (SBCCOM). In June 2003, RDECOM assumed operational control of the RDE centers. An organizational ceremony took place in October 2003 at Aberdeen Proving Ground, where SBCCOM officially stood down and the 389th Army Band and the Army Material Command's Acquisition Center were assigned to RDECOM.
RDECOM became a major subordinate command of the Army Material Command in March 2004, with over 17,000 military, civilian, and contractor personnel at the time. In 2006, the 389th Army Band was designated AMC Band and moved to Redstone Arsenal, Alabama. In 2008, the AMC Acquisition Center became part of the new Army Contracting Command, itself a major subordinate of the AMC. From February 2012 to September 2014, RDECOM was led by a civilian commander, Dale Ormond, before returning to military command.

Transfer to Army Futures Command 

As of 2018, CCDC reports to Army Futures Command, which will reach full operational capability by August 2019. The new command is focused on readiness for future combat with near-peer competitors, in a shift away from the unconventional, asymmetric warfare fought in various theaters since 2001.

On 4 June 2018, the Headquarters, Department of the Army published General Order 2018–10, "Establishment of the United States Army Futures Command," formally transferring RDECOM from AMC to the new command effective 1 July 2018. The transition of authority from AMC to AFC took place at Aberdeen Proving Ground, MD on 31 January 2019, with a reflagging of the Command and repatching of the commander and CSM.

List of commanding generals

See also
 United States Marine Corps Warfighting Laboratory (MCWL)
 Naval Research Laboratory (NRL)
 Air Force Research Laboratory (AFRL)
 DARPA

References

Harford County, Maryland
Combat Capabilities Development Command
Combat Capabilities Development Command
Military simulation
Combat Capabilities Development